is a concrete gravity dam on the upper reaches of the Ōno River in Taketa, Ōita Prefecture, Japan. It was constructed in 1938, and is 86 m wide and 14 m tall.

It appearance has gained it the designation of Important Cultural Properties of Japan.

References

Dams in Ōita Prefecture
Gravity dams
Dams completed in 1938
Important Cultural Properties of Japan